Won Alexander Cumyow was an early Chinese Canadian public servant and community leader.

Early life 
Born in 1861 on February 14 or March 17 in Port Douglas, British Columbia (at the north end of Harrison Lake, at the start of the Douglas Road to Lillooet, British Columbia during the Fraser Canyon Gold Rush), Won Cumyow was the oldest son of Won Ling Sing, a Hakka-speaking store and restaurant owner who had emigrated in 1858 from China to San Francisco and later to Port Douglas. Won Cumyow was the first person of Chinese descent known to have been born within the boundaries of present-day Canada (British Columbia being a colony in 1861).

He attended high school in New Westminster and became a court interpreter (1888) and labour contractor. He was an interpreter in the Vancouver police court from 1904 to 1936, speaking English, Cantonese, Hakka, and also the Chinook Jargon, which he had learned as a child at Port Douglas. He studied law, even articled, but was not permitted a license because, being Chinese, he was denied the vote.

Won Cumyow voted for the first time in 1890 but provincial legislation in 1895–1896 stripped Chinese (as well as Japanese and First Nations) voting rights in elections in BC (though his name still does appear on the 1898 BC voters list). The voters' list in federal elections came from the provincial election's voters' list, and so the federal franchise was also blocked. The federal Chinese Immigration Act of 1923 also known as the Chinese Exclusion Act, was repealed after World War II on 1947 May 14, and he then voted again in the next federal election in 1949—making him the only Chinese person to have voted both before and after the disenfranchisement. A photo of him voting has been reprinted many times.

Community work
Active in the Vancouver's Chinese community, he was founder of the Chinese Empire Reform Association (an organization of overseas Chinese, active mostly between 1899 and 1911, made up of mostly the older, more prosperous Chinese merchants in Canada, and supporting the modernization of China through progressive reforms within the framework of a constitutional monarchy rather than by armed revolution), and a president of the Chinese Benevolent Association. Chinese merchants had formed the Chinese Consolidated Benevolent Association, with the first branch in Victoria in 1884 and the second one in Vancouver in 1895. The Association was mandatory for all Chinese in the area to join, and it did everything from representing members in legal disputes to sending the remains of a member who died back to his or her ancestral homeland in China.

Marriage
Won Cumyow married Ye Eva Chan on November 29, 1889. A Chinese Methodist missionary family had adopted her and brought her to Canada from Hong Kong in 1888. Together Won Cumyow and Ye Eva had ten children. Their third son, Gordon Won Cumyow, took over the position of court interpreter and became the first Chinese notary public in Canada.

Death
Won Cumyow died on October 6, 1955, in Vancouver.

Legacy
Won Cumyow is one of eight finalists for the $5 polymer bills in Canada.

Notes

References

External links
 Won Cumyow & family in 1881 Canadian Census
 Won Cumyow & family in 1891 Canadian Census
 Won Cumyow & family in 1901 Canadian Census
 Won Cumyow & family in 1911 Canadian Census
 Won Cumyow registered as first native-born under 1923 Chinese Immigration Act
 PDF - Biography on SFU site
 List of fonds at University of British Columbia
 PDF describing fonds at UBC
 PDF file containing relevant source documents

Cumyow, Won Alexander
Cumyow, Won Alexander
Cumyow, Won Alexander
Cumyow, Won Alexander
Cumyow, Won Alexander
Cumyow, Won Alexander
Cumyow, Won Alexander